Korean African or African Korean may refer to:
 Afro-Asians, people of mixed African and Asian (including Korean) descent
 Koreans in Africa
 Africans in North Korea
 Africans in South Korea